The grey-capped hemispingus (Kleinothraupis reyi) is a species of bird in the family Thraupidae that is endemic to Venezuela.

Its natural habitat is subtropical or tropical moist montane forests where it is threatened by habitat loss.

Description
The species have a grey crown and don't have any supercilium. Their upperparts are olive in colour and their underparts are yellow.

Habitat

References

grey-capped hemispingus
Birds of the Venezuelan Andes
Endemic birds of Venezuela
grey-capped hemispingus
Taxonomy articles created by Polbot